Kathiani Constituency is an electoral constituency in Kenya. It is one of eight constituencies in Machakos County. The constituency was established for the 1988 elections.

Members of Parliament

Locations and wards

References

External links 
Map of the constituency

Constituencies in Machakos County
1988 establishments in Kenya
Constituencies established in 1988
Constituencies in Eastern Province (Kenya)